Chilina fulgurata is a species of air-breathing freshwater snail, an aquatic pulmonate gastropod mollusk in the family Chilinidae.

References

Chilinidae
Gastropods described in 1911